Pontoon is an unincorporated community in Conway County, Arkansas, United States.

References

Unincorporated communities in Conway County, Arkansas
Unincorporated communities in Arkansas